The International Futures Forum (IFF) is a non-profit organisation based in Scotland that is involved with research and consultancy activities that are funded by business, philanthropy and the public sector. It is a think tank with links to a variety of other groups and organisations, largely through common memberships. It maintains an international network of thinkers, businesspeople and policy makers.

History
The IFF was established in 2001, with BP providing some significant financial backing. Initially the IFF had a close association with the Scottish Council Foundation (SCF), a think-tank based in Edinburgh which had been formed in 1997 and was led by Graham Leicester. After the initial two years IFF continued developing through its members voluntary work and occasional assignments.

The IFF has been registered as a charity in Scotland since 2007 and IFF Praxis Ltd operates as a private commercial company. IFF has a board of trustees which oversee both the activities of IFF and its related Praxis Centres (currently in UK and US).

Collaborations and output 
The IFF has worked with a variety of organisations. Much of the material that is produced by the IFF is made available under a creative commons licence. The work has included areas such as health, learning, enterprise and governance.

Refinery downsizing
In 2002, as part of adjusting to global competition, BP had decided to downsize their Grangemouth Refinery and anticipated laying off about 1000 employees. BP realised that this would result in a significant depression on the local economy and asked the IFF how it could demonstrate some form of responsibility towards local stakeholders. The IFF responded by proposing to reframe this as a creative opportunity, portraying the sacking of workers as being the release of high quality resources into the community. BP is no longer owner of the refinery and Falkirk has gone on to attract large scale of inward investments to place its economy on a different path through "My Future's in Falkirk".

Fife health
Soon after being formed, the IFF conducted case studies looking at health provision for deprived individuals and communities in Fife.

Learning society
As part of the IFF group's early work they also conducted case studies on the learning society in Dundee. This work also been cited in places such as UNESCO's policy around a learning society.

Radioactive waste
In 2004, IFF / Praxis was commissioned by Nirex "to provide corporate communications advice in relation to the Managing Radioactive Waste Safely (MRWS) consultation programme". A 16 ft by 5 ft mural was produced as part of this collaboration. IFF is neither pro nor anti-nuclear and its interest was in exploring perspectives on how the transient nature of cultures and civilisations could be recognised with hazards that lasts for tens of thousands of years. The IFF also made a written submission to the UK Parliament Select Committee on Public Administration on policy making in a world we don't understand and can't control.

Kitbag
In 2004, The IFF Psychological Capacity project began, intending to look at cost-effective strategies and tools that could enlarge psychological capacity outside of care and welfare systems. In 2007 IFF received a grant from the National Endowment for Science, Technology and the Arts (NESTA) to further develop.

Community health 
In 2005, the IFF were engaged by the Royal College of General Practitioners in Scotland (RCGP) on a project intended to distil the "essence" of general practice. In 2014, the IFF were commissioned by the RCGP to help with work on community engagement.

Glasgow life and health
The Glasgow Centre for Population Health (GCPH) formed in 2004 and the IFF have been involved in several of their projects. The IFF were one of several organisations to provide support for the "Glasgow Indicators" project. The GCPH also developed the "Glasgow Game" which was based upon the IFF's "World Game" that had been created by Tony Hodgson. "Miniature Glasgow" is a short film that GCPH made in collaboration with IFF to discuss life and health in Glasgow.

Curriculum for Excellence
The IFF did some work with Education Scotland (and previously with HM Inspectorate of Schools) to help schools reflect and consider what is possible under the permissive framework of Curriculum for Excellence. The IFF had first published a workbook in the Spring of 2009. Education Scotland later produced a kit for transformational change that was influenced by the IFF material.

Healthcare education
In 2011, the IFF facilitated a workshop for NHS Education for Scotland in Edinburgh attended by a mixture of participants responsible for service and education aspects of the health service.

Prison policy
In June 2014, Colin McConnell, chief executive of the Scottish Prison Service (SPS), delivered a speech at an event organised by the IFF. McConnell laid out a compelling case "for the public acceptance of the need for forgiveness and redemption as the future cornerstone for reducing reoffending".

Funding
According to the IFF it enjoys "a variety of productive and mutually beneficial relationships with sponsors, clients, subscribers, like-minded groups, research funders and others". What they label "core support" comes from BP and BT. Other organisations the IFF has worked with include
 Diageo
 Foreign and Commonwealth Office
 Scottish Parliament
 Scottish Executive
 UK Nirex Ltd
 Scottish Enterprise
 World Economic Forum
 Tayside Health Board
 Glasgow Centre for Population Health
The IFF has a number of subscribers to their research output, among which are
 World Economic Forum
 Henley Centre
 Diageo
 Falkirk Council
 Audit Scotland
 AOL (Europe) Ltd
 Cultureshift Co-operative, Australia
Research funding has come from
 Scottish Enterprise Glasgow
 Society for Organizational Learning (Scotland)'

Associated people
As of 2015, there are 5 staff employed by IFF, including the Director, Graham Leicester and Andrew Lyon, in a role described as "Converger".

The following people have also had some involvement:
Martin Albrow  − 	Formerly Professor of Sociology, State University of New York, Stony Brook, author
Ruth Anderson  −	Chief Executive, Barataria Foundation, Scotland
Tony Beesley  −	Conceptual artist and cartoonist
Max Boisot  −	Adjunct professor of Asian Business and Comparative Management at INSEAD, Fontainebleau, France, author
Roberto Carneiro  −	Former Education Minister, President of Grupo Forum, Portugal, UNESCO International Commission on Education for the Twenty-first Century
Napier Collyns  −	Co-founder, Global Business Network (GBN), Emeryville, California
Brian Goodwin − Schumacher College, Devon and Santa Fe Institute, author
Mike Hambly  −	Business consultant, formerly Chief Executive, Digital Animations Group, Glasgow
Margaret Hannah − Consultant in Public Health Medicine, Deputy Director of Public Health in NHS Fife (and married to Graham Leicester).
Pat Heneghan  −	Director, ForthRoad Limited, Scotland
Rebecca Hodgson  −	Researcher, International Futures Forum
Tony Hodgson  −	Director, Decision Integrity Limited, founder Metabridge AB, collaborator with the Schumacher Institute for Sustainable Systems, Senior adviser to Global Leaders Group
Robert E. Horn  −	Visiting Scholar, Stanford University, author
Kees van der Heijden − Professor at Templeton College, Oxford, author
Pat Kane −	Writer, theorist and musician, Glasgow, author
Eamonn Kelly 	 −President, Global Business Network, Emeryville, California, author
David Lorimer  −	Scientific and Medical Network, Scotland, editor
Charles Lowe 	−Consultant, Former head of e-government BT
Wendy Luhabe  −	Bridging the Gap, South Africa, author
Arun Maira  −	Boston Consulting Group, Delhi, India, author
Wolfgang Michalski  −	WM International, formerly Director, OECD International Futures Programme
Maureen O'Hara  −	President Emerita, Saybrook Graduate School, San Francisco and IFF
Ian Page  −	Former Research Manager / Futurist, HP Research Labs.
Nick Rengger  −	Professor of Political Theory and International Relations, University of St Andrews, author
Jennifer Williams  −	Director, Centre for Creative Communities, UK
Mark Woodhouse  −	Professor of Philosophy Emeritus at Georgia State University, USA, author

References

External links
 

Research institutes in Scotland
Think tanks established in 2001
2001 establishments in Scotland
Think tanks based in Scotland